Latin diacritics may refer to:
 diacritics of the Latin alphabet
 diacritics used in the Latin language (see )